Henrik Christiansen (born 9 October 1996) is a Norwegian swimmer.

Junior career
He won three medals at the 2014 European Junior Swimming Championships.

Senior career
He won a silver medal at the 2016 European Aquatics Championships in the 400 metre freestyle.

He also competed at the 2015 World Aquatics Championships.

He turned down swimming scholarship offers from Stanford University and UC Berkeley to continue his training in Norway.

International Swimming League 
In 2019, he was a member of the 2019 International Swimming League representing Team Iron. He won the 400 m freestyle in London.

Records
He holds multiple national swimming records.

References

External links
 
 
 
 
 

Living people
1996 births
Swimmers at the 2014 Summer Youth Olympics
Norwegian male freestyle swimmers
Swimmers at the 2016 Summer Olympics
Olympic swimmers of Norway
European Aquatics Championships medalists in swimming
European Championships (multi-sport event) silver medalists
World Aquatics Championships medalists in swimming
Medalists at the FINA World Swimming Championships (25 m)
Swimmers at the 2020 Summer Olympics
21st-century Norwegian people
20th-century Norwegian people